Urs Zimmermann (born 29 November 1959 in Mühledorf) is a Swiss former professional road racing cyclist. He stood on the podium in two of the three Grand Tour events after finishing third in 1986 Tour de France and 1988 Giro d'Italia. He also won several stage races such as the Tour de Suisse, Dauphiné Libéré and Critérium International.

After the eleventh stage of the 1991 Tour de France, there was a rest day, on which the cyclists were transferred from Nantes to Pau, by airplane. Zimmermann had a fear of flying, so he refused to use the airplane. The jury then disqualified him, but after the other cyclists protested, he was allowed to use other means of transportation.

He was the Swiss National Road Race champion in 1986.

Career achievements

Major results

1981
 3rd National Hill Climb Championships
 10th Overall Grand Prix Guillaume Tell
1982
 2nd Overall Grand Prix Guillaume Tell
 3rd Overall Tour du Vaucluse
1983
 4th GP du Canton d'Argovie 
1984
 1st  Overall Tour de Suisse
 1st Grabs–Voralp
 2nd Gran Premio di Lugano
 7th La Flèche Wallonne
 9th Trofeo Baracchi
1985
 1st GP de la Liberté
 1st Stage 9a (TTT) Tour de Suisse
 2nd Giro del Piemonte
 3rd Coppa Agostoni
 8th Coppa Sabatini
1986
 1st  Road race, National Road Championships
 1st  Overall Criterium du Dauphiné Libéré
 1st  Overall Critérium International
1st Stage 2
 1st Giro del Lazio
 1st Profronde van Tiel
 2nd Overall Paris–Nice
 3rd Overall Tour de France
 4th Overall Tour de Suisse
 8th Overall Tour de Romandie
 10th Giro dell'Emilia
1987
 1st Stage 2 (TTT) Tour de France
 6th Gran Premio di Lugano
 8th Overall Paris–Nice
1st Stage 1 (TTT)
1988
 1st  Overall Giro del Trentino
1st Stage 1
 3rd Overall Tour de Romandie
1st Stage 4b (ITT)
 3rd Overall Giro d'Italia
 6th Rund um den Henninger Turm
1989
 5th Overall Tour de Romandie
 6th Overall Giro d'Italia
1990
 2nd Giro del Friuli
 4th Overall Giro del Trentino

General classification results timeline

References

External links

1959 births
Living people
People from Bucheggberg District
Swiss male cyclists
Sportspeople from the canton of Solothurn